Frank J. Coyne (born 1948 in Scranton, Pennsylvania) is Chairman, former President, and former Chief Executive Officer of Verisk Analytics and its subsidiary, Insurance Services Office (ISO).

Biography

Personal life
Coyne received his bachelor’s degree in political science as magna cum laude from the University of Scranton and his J.D. degree from Duquesne University. He also had a career in the United States Army, rising to the rank of captain.

Career 
Coyne began his career in 1973 as a trial attorney with the U.S. Treasury Department. He joined Lynn Insurance Group in 1977 and served as vice president as well as assistant general counsel. In 1981, he joined Reliance Insurance Company and served as associate corporate general counsel and general counsel for the insurance business. He became vice president and general counsel of PMA Insurance Company in 1983.

Coyne joined General Accident Insurance Co. of America in 1985 as senior vice president and general counsel, with responsibility for legal, human resources, and administrative functions. Two years later, he became executive vice president - field operations, with responsibility for underwriting, claims, and marketing activities involving General Accident’s 28 branch offices. In 1991, he was elected president and chief operating officer.

In February 1999 Coyne came to ISO as president and chief operating officer from Kemper Insurance Companies, where he served as executive vice president – specialty and risk management groups. On July 1, 2000, he was elected president and chief executive officer and became chairman two years later. During his career at ISO (later Verisk Analytics), Coyne led the company to grow revenue and profitability, culminating with a successful IPO in 2009.

References

ISO: Frank Coyne biography

1948 births
American chief executives of financial services companies
American businesspeople in insurance
American lawyers
University of Scranton alumni
Duquesne University School of Law alumni
Businesspeople from Scranton, Pennsylvania
Living people
American chief operating officers